is a generic term for radish in Japanese language. For example, European radish is called  in Japan. In the West, the word daikon sometimes refers to long white Asian radish varieties and sometimes Japanese radish varieties.

Varieties 
Most Chinese and Indian forms are roughly similar.

References 

Asian radishes
Root vegetables
Japanese vegetables